Privalov's Millions  is a 1972 two-part drama film based on the novel by Dmitry Mamin-Sibiryak.

Plot 
In his native city in the Urals back Sergey Privalov - heir to a colossal state. He is full of ideas rebuilding this life: dreams to modernize plants to build schools and hospitals. But there are other hunters heritage, and because Privalov millions ignite serious passions.

Cast
 Leonid Kulagin as Sergey Privalov 
 Lyudmila Chursina as Zosya Lyakhovskaya (Privalova)
 Vladislav Strzhelchik as  Alexander Polovodov
 Lyudmila Khityaeva as Antonida Polovodova
 Andrei Fajt as Ignatii L'vovich Lyakhovsky
 Lyubov Sokolova as Maria Bakhareva
 Aleksandr Demyanenko as Viktor Bakharev
 Yevgeniy Yevstigneyev as Ivan Yakovlevich
 Igor Yasulovich as Maxim Loskutov
 Yuri Puzyryov as Nicolas Veryovkin
 Stanislav Chekan as Kuzma Ferapontovich Kanunnikov
 Lyudmila Shagalova as Khionia Alekseyevna Zaplatina
 Anatoly Kubatsky as Belmontov
 Valentina Sharykina as actress Kolpakova
 Grigory Shpigel as Oscar Filippovich
 Galina Kindinova as Nadezhda Vasilevna Bakhareva
 Leonid Nevedomsky as Sashka
 Alexey Pokrovsky (episode)

Shooting 
The film was shot in Kungur and its surroundings.

References

External links
 

1970s historical drama films
Russian historical drama films
Films based on Russian novels
Soviet historical drama films
Films set in the 19th century
1970s Russian-language films